Live @ KlangArt is the thirty-fourth album by Klaus Schulze. It was originally released in 2001 as two separate CDs, and in 2008 was the twenty-ninth and last Schulze album reissued by Revisited Records as a single album. Live @ KlangArt was released after Schulze's Silver Edition and Historic Edition 10-disc CD box sets, as well as Jubilee Edition 25-disc CD box set and Contemporary Works I 10-disc CD box set, technically making this album his eighty-ninth.

Track listing
All tracks composed by Klaus Schulze.

Disc 1

Disc 2

External links
 Live @ KlangArt 1 at the official site of Klaus Schulze
 Live @ KlangArt 2 at the official site of Klaus Schulze
 
 KlangArt-Festival Osnabrueck, Germany, 2001

References 

2001 live albums
Klaus Schulze live albums